Benudia is a census town in Bhagabanpur I CD block in Egra subdivision of Purba Medinipur district in the state of West Bengal, India.

Geography

Location

Urbanisation
96.96% of the population of Egra subdivision live in the rural areas. Only 3.04% of the population live in the urban areas, and that is the lowest proportion of urban population amongst the four subdivisions in Purba Medinipur district.

Note: The map alongside presents some of the notable locations in the subdivision. All places marked in the map are linked in the larger full screen map.

Demographics
As per 2011 Census of India Benudia had a total population of 6,797 of which 3,509 (52%) were males and 3,288 (48%) were females. Population below 6 years was 940. The total number of literates in Benudia was 4,874 (83.22% of the population over 6 years).

Infrastructure
As per the District Census Handbook 2011, Benudia covered an area of 2.2824 km2. It had the facility of a railway station at Deshapran 13 km away and bus routes in the town. Amongst the civic amenities it had 23 road lighting points and 764 domestic electric connections. Amongst the educational facilities it had were 4 primary schools, 1 middle school and 1 secondary school.  The nearest senior secondary school is at Bhagabanpur 1 km away. The nearest degree college was at Kismat Bajkul 3 km away. Amongst the recreational and cultural facilities, a cinema theatre was there in the town.

Transport
Benudia is on the Egra-Bajkul Road.

Education
The nearest degree college, Bajkul Milani Mahavidyalaya was established at Tethi Bari mouza, PO Kismat Bajkul, in 1964.

The nearest higher secondary school, Bhagwanpur High School at Bhagabanpur was established in 1923.

Healthcare
Bhagabanpur Rural Hospital, the main medical facility in Bhagabanpur I CD block, is located nearby.

References

Cities and towns in Purba Medinipur district